Miroslav Budinov  (born 23 January 1986) is a Bulgarian professional footballer who plays as a forward for Dunav Ruse.

References

External links
 

1986 births
Living people
Bulgarian footballers
Akademik Sofia players
PFC Cherno More Varna players
FC Sportist Svoge players
FC Lyubimets players
FC Dunav Ruse players
FC Septemvri Sofia players
FC Botev Vratsa players
FC Tsarsko Selo Sofia players
FC Krumovgrad players
First Professional Football League (Bulgaria) players
Association football forwards
Bulgarian expatriate footballers
Expatriate footballers in Greece